, stylized as EMPiRE, was a Japanese alternative idol girl group formed between WACK and Avex Trax in 2017. They have released three studio albums, two EPs and four singles since their formation. They disbanded in June 2022 and redebuted as ExWhyZ later that year.

History

2017: Formation and debut as Empire
On April 2, 2017, WACK announced a joint project with Avex Entertainment. On August 23, The group name was announced as Empire. By September 28, all members of the group had been revealed. The group's first song "Empire is Coming" was released on October 6, the song was later featured on WACK & Scrambles Works.

2018: The Empire Strikes Start!! 
Empire's first album, The Empire Strikes Start!!, was released on April 11, 2018. The song "Black to the dreamlight" was featured on Black Clover as an ending theme. The group held their first concert named after their debut album on May 1. That same day the group's first member, Yuina Empire transferred to Bis and new members Maho Empire and Mikina Empire joined the group. The Empire Next Edition Tour was held from July to September of the same year. On September 5, Empire released their first EP, Empire Originals.

2019–2020: The Great Journey Album 
On February 27, 2019, Empire's first single, "Pierce", was released. The song "Pierce" was featured on the final season of Fairy Tail as an ending theme. From March 3 to 4 Empire broadcast the 24-hour live event "Empire Presents Twenty Four Hour Party People". After the event, Yuka Empire left Empire to focus on academic work. On March 30, Now Empire was added as the group's new member. Empire embarked on their second concert tour, the New Empire Tour, from April to June. On July 17, Empire's second single, "Success Story", was released. On October 16, Empire's third single, "Right Now", was released. The song "Right Now" became Empire's second song to feature on Black Clover, this time as an opening theme. Empire embarked on their third concert tour, Empire's Great Escape Tour, from November to December. Empire's second album, The Great Journey Album, was released on December 18.

The group was scheduled to hold their Super Feeling Good Tour from May to June 2020, however it was cancelled due to the COVID-19 pandemic. They released their second EP, Super Cool EP, on August 5, 2020. They held the Empire Error Error Error Tour from November to December 2020.

2021–2022: Bright Future and disbandment 
On March 17, 2021, Empire released a special single featuring new versions of "Don't tell me why" and "Tokyo Moonlight". Empire's fourth single, "Hon-no / Iza!!" was released on May 12. The song "Hon-no" was featured on High-Rise Invasion as an opening theme. They held their Empire Ultra Vibes Tour from April to May 2021. Empire's third album, Bright Future, was released on November 10, 2021. They will hold their Empire Dope Magic Tour from April to June 2022.

On June 2, the group held their final concert as Empire. It was announced at the concert that they would re-debut as members of ExWhyZ under EMI Records later that year. Through July and August, Empire held their final tour. On August 17, the group's final music release as Empire, a digital EP titled The Final Empire, was released.

Members

Final line-up
Yu-ki Empire
Mayu Empire
Midoriko Empire
Maho Empire
Mikina Empire
Now Empire

Former
Yuina Empire
Yuka Empire

Discography

Studio albums

Extended plays

Singles

As lead artist

Collaborations

Filmography

DVDs

Blu-rays

Concerts and tours

Tours
 Empire Next Edition Tour (2018)
 New Empire Tour (2019)
 Empire's Great Escape Tour (2019)
 Super Feeling Good Tour (2020; Cancelled)
 Empire Error Error Error Tour (2020)
 Empire Ultra Vibes Tour (2021)
 Empire Dope Magic Tour (2022)
  (2022)

Concerts
 The Empire Strikes Start!! (2018)
 Empire Presents Twenty Four Hour Party People (2019)
 New Empire Tour "Evolutions" (2019)
 The End of Summer at Okinawa with Empire (2019)
 Empire's Great Party Vol. 0 (2019)
 Empire's Great Party Vol. 1 (2019)
 Empire's Great Revenge Live (2020)
 Empire Breaks Through The Limit Live (2020)
 Empire's Greatest Party "Eat Sleep Empire Repeat" (2021)
 Empire's Great Party Caravans (2021)
 Empire's Super Ultra Spectacular Show (2021)

References

Japanese idol groups
Japanese pop music groups
Musical groups from Tokyo
Musical groups established in 2017
2017 establishments in Japan
Musical groups disestablished in 2022
2022 disestablishments in Japan